Argyractis drumalis is a moth in the family Crambidae. It is found in North America, where it has been recorded from Florida.

The length of the forewings is about 5 mm. Adults have been recorded on wing from February to November.

The larvae feed on the roots of Pistia stratiotes and Nymphaea species. They are aquatic.

Etymology
The species is named for Fort Drum, the type location.

References

Acentropinae
Moths of North America
Moths described in 1906